Air core may refer to:

 Air core drilling, a form of rotary air drilling
 Air core gauge
 Magnetic core